"Numbers in Action" is a single from British grime artist Wiley. It is the first single released from his seventh album 100% Publishing. It was released on 5 April 2011 as a Digital download.

Music video 
The music video was uploaded to YouTube on 14 April 2011.

Track listings
 Digital download
 "Numbers in Action" (Radio Edit) – 3:12

Digital download – EP
 "Numbers in Action" – 3:23
 "Numbers in Action" (Sticky Remix) – 3:59
 "Numbers in Action" (Dobie's Crunch Music Remix) – 2:52
 "Numbers in Action" (Toddska Remix) – 4:20
 "Numbers in Action" (ZDot Remix) – 2:52

Credits and personnel 
 Lead vocals – Wiley
 Producer – Wiley
 Lyrics – Richard Cowie
 Label: Big Dada

Chart performance

Release history

References 

2011 singles
Wiley (musician) songs